Dune Jewelry Inc. is an American manufacturer of jewelry in Massachusetts. It was started in 2010 by Holly Daniels Christensen. Some of its designs incorporate sand collected from beaches or elsewhere.

Background
In 2007, Christensen started making sand jewelry for family and friends, by 2010 she launched Dune Jewelry and served as its chief operating officer since. Over the years, the company's Sandbank– the world's largest– had collected 3,300 samples from beaches, sports venues, trails, mountaintops, historical locations and iconic events from all over the globe. The company's handcrafted products have since distributed by over 800 retailers worldwide.

Recognition 

 In 2018, Inc. magazine included it in its annual list of fastest-growing list of companies listing a three-year revenue growth of 164% and a 2017 revenue of $3.4 million.
In 2017, the company was awarded the Women-Owned Business of the Year Award for Massachusetts and New England.

Philanthropy
Dune Jewelry has donated over $160,000 to numerous charitable organizations since it was founded in 2010. The charitable causes were mostly of environmental concern, especially coastal preservation efforts. Dune Jewelry has also partnered with several sustainable companies.

References

External links
 
American companies established in 2010
American brands
Jewelry companies of the United States
Companies based in Massachusetts
Privately held companies
Manufacturing companies established in 2010
Design companies established in 2010